"Purple Giraffe" is the second episode in the first season of the television series How I Met Your Mother. It originally aired on September 26, 2005. The episode was written by Carter Bays & Craig Thomas and it was directed by Pamela Fryman.

Ted throwing multiple parties hoping that Robin will attend is reminiscent of The Great Gatsby.

Plot 
Future Ted quickly recaps the time he met Robin and accidentally told her that he loved her.

A week has gone by since that incident, and Ted and Marshall find Robin in MacLaren's talking with Lily. After Robin leaves, Lily lets slip that Robin told Lily that she was interested in Ted, but she is looking for something "casual" and he is not. Ted decides to try to be casual in his pursuit of Robin.

On Friday afternoon, Ted sees Robin on the news covering a kid stuck inside a crane machine at a bodega nearby, and sprints over to meet Robin. When Robin sees him, he casually says that he is buying dip for a party they are hosting and invites Robin as well. This puts Marshall in a bind, as he has a 25-page paper on constitutional law due on Monday that he has not even started and he must also contend with Lily who is so happy to be engaged that she is always in the mood for love, but he gamely goes ahead with the party. Barney, meanwhile, tries to convince Ted to pick up a random girl at the party. Ted declines, so Barney finds said random girl and hooks up with her himself. In the end, Robin does not show up.

Ted impulsively tells Robin that the party will continue Saturday night as well, putting Marshall further behind the eight ball and subjecting Barney to a reunion with his random hook-up. Barney gets rid of her by telling her he is in love with her, as Ted did with Robin. Once again, Robin fails to come to the party, and on Sunday morning, Ted tells her the party will continue that night as well.

The party on Sunday is sparsely attended, and Marshall loses his temper when his law book, which he needs for his paper that is now due the next morning, is used as a coaster. He angrily lashes out at Ted for throwing three parties for Robin, realizing too late that she is present this time. Ted covers by lying to Robin and telling her that he wanted her to meet another guy, Carlos (who had been mentioned but who none of the main characters knew). After a time, Ted talks to Robin on the roof, and Robin is able to recognise his true feelings. In an attempt to prove to her that he does not necessary have the feelings, he kisses her, but he realises he does have those feelings and cannot take them away. Robin suggests that they can be friends. Ted is unsure because he is worried things might become awkward between them, but he comes around and takes Robin to formally meet his friends. They go for a drink with the gang, where Robin fits perfectly in the group - by mocking Barney's jealousy and inability to get a date for the night while Carlos is making out with the random hook-up. Marshall announces he will drink two beers, go upstairs, write a 25-page paper, and get an 'A'; Future Ted tells his children that, in fact, Marshall got a B− on the paper, still impressive considering he wrote it all in one night.

While helping Ted get another round of drinks, Robin reminds Ted that he is a good catch and he will make some girl very happy, and offers to help him find "the one".

Reception

Ratings 
When it first aired in America, on September 26, 2005, the episode was watched by 10.40 million viewers.

Reviews 
The TV Critic rated the episode 63 out of 100, stating that it was a "really fun follow up to the pilot".

References

External links 
 

How I Met Your Mother (season 1) episodes
2005 American television episodes